Rockwall can refer to:

Australia

 Rockwall, Potts Point, a heritage-listed house and former school in Potts Point, Sydney

United States

 Rockwall, Texas
 Rockwall County, Texas

See also
 Rockall (disambiguation)